The 1992 Yugoslav People's Army column incident in Tuzla, also known as Tuzla column was an attack on the 92nd Motorized Brigade of the Yugoslav People's Army (JNA) in the Bosnian city of Tuzla on 15 May 1992. The incident occurred at the road junction of Brčanska Malta. At least 92 soldiers of the JNA were killed and 33 wounded during the attacks, with estimates reaching 200 killed. What started off as a peaceful retreat by agreement with local authorities but ended in an ambush when Patriotic League, Green Berets and Bosniaks from local police attacked the column.  It was a repeat of a similar incident that occurred in Sarajevo a week prior.

Background
When the Bosnian War broke out in April 1992, there were four types of federal and Serb armed forces in Bosnia and Herzegovina. These were; the Yugoslav people's Army (JNA), volunteer units raised by the JNA, Bosnian Serb Territorial Defense (TO) detachments, and Bosnian Serb Ministry of Internal Affairs Police (MUP). With the withdrawal of the JNA from Slovenia and much of Croatia, by early April 1992 the JNA in western Croatia and Bosnia and Herzegovina had around 100,000–110,000 troops, equipped with about 500 tanks, 400 medium artillery pieces, 48 multiple rocket launchers, and 350 120 mm mortars. In addition, the JNA had 120 fighter-bombers, 40 light helicopters and 30 transport helicopters. The Bosnian Serb MUP totalled about 15,000, including active, special and reserve police. From March 1991, the leaders of Bosniak-based Party of Democratic Action (SDA) had been developing an armed force called the "Patriotic League of People's" or Patriotic League, and despite an arms embargo, weapons began to be issued in August 1991. By April 1992, the Patriotic League numbered around 40,000 troops, in nine regional commands, one of which was reportedly headquartered in Tuzla.

When the war broke out, the Bosnia and Herzegovina TO was mobilised, but the JNA refused to return its weaponry, which it had confiscated in 1990. Bosniaks and Bosnian Croats had already left the JNA. The priority for the JNA was the security of its bases, as this had proven to be a vulnerability during the Battle of the Barracks in Croatian War of Independence. At the beginning of April, a number of towns in north-eastern Bosnia fell in quick succession to a combination of JNA, Serb volunteer and Bosnian Serb forces. These included Bijeljina, Zvornik, Višegrad, and Foča. On 15 April, Bosnian MUP and TO seized the arms, ammunition and equipment of the Tuzla Regional TO in the towns of Srebrenik, Lukavac and in Tuzla itself. By the end of the month, the Bosnian Government had re-organised the Bosnia and Herzegovina TO, incorporating the troops of the Patriotic League. In total, the new force had around 100,000 men, but only about 40,000–50,000 small arms and virtually no heavy weapons.

Attack 
On May 15, 1992, Yugoslav People’s Army forces in Tuzla were pulling out of their barracks in Husinsko Brdo in Tuzla and were heading towards Bijeljina, which was under Serb control since late 1991. There was an exchange of fire with local Territorial Defence and police forces at the Brcanska Malta crossroads. After an attempt to leave at 14:00, the convoy was stopped at a checkpoint by elements of the Bosnia and Herzegovina TO, and was sent back to the barracks. The column left the barracks again at 19:00, heading north-east towards Bijeljina via the Brčko road. The lead vehicle contained the commander of the JNA garrison, Lieutenant Colonel Mile Dubajić, and his vehicle was followed by one containing members of the Bosnia and Herzegovina TO. When the convoy reached the intersection with the road leading east to Simin Han, it came under small arms fire from members of the Bosnia and Herzegovina TO.

According to an indictment issued by the Office of the War Crimes Prosecutor of the Republic of Serbia in the District Court of Belgrade War Crimes Chamber on 9 November 2007, at least 92 members of the JNA were killed in the attack on the convoy, a further 33 were wounded, and a number of military vehicles, including ambulances, were also destroyed. The names of those killed and wounded in the attack were listed in the indictment.

Later developments
Years later, the Serbian War Crimes Prosecutor's Office indicted former head of Tuzla public security, an ethnic Croat Ilija Jurišić, on suspicion that he committed a war crime by allegedly ordering the attack. The case was dismissed before Bosnian courts. He was arrested at the Belgrade Airport in May 2007 and was found guilty of improper battlefield conduct in 2009 and sentenced to 12 years in prison. In October 2010, an appeals court later overturned the sentence. The Belgrade Appeals Court ordered a re-trial and released him from detention. Tuzla citizens have continued to express their support for Ilija Jurišić. Subsequently, Jurišić was welcomed by a large crowd upon his return to Tuzla on 11 October 2010 after his sentence was overturned. The re-trial was held and he was sentenced again to 12 years in prison. On 2 April 2015, an appeal commenced against the result of the re-trial. In March 2016, his conviction was again overturned.

The city of Tuzla celebrates 15 May as "City Liberation Day".

See also 
25 May 1995 Tuzla shelling
1992 Yugoslav People's Army column incident in Sarajevo

References

Sources

External links 
 Tuzla Column (Pros. v. Ilija Jurišić)
 Novi Reporter: Incomplete Lineup (First indictments for Tuzla convoy)

1992 in Bosnia and Herzegovina
1992 in Yugoslavia
Attacks in 1992
Battles of the Bosnian War
Bosnian War
History of Tuzla
Controversies in Bosnia and Herzegovina
May 1992 events in Europe
Ambushes in Europe